The Indonesia–Malaysia–Thailand Growth Triangle (IMT-GT) started as an early attempt at economic liberalisation & integration in ASEAN. It was formally endorsed by Indonesia’s President Suharto, Malaysia’s Prime Minister Tun Dr. Mahathir Mohammad and Thailand’s Prime Minister Chuan Leekpai in 1993.

The IMT-GT is a strategic framework of international economic co-operation by the approval of leaders from the 3 countries to develop the area in the southern part of Thailand, some areas of Malaysia (Kedah, Perlis, Perak, Penang, Selangor, Kelantan, Melaka, Negeri Sembilan) and some areas of Indonesia (Aceh, North Sumatera, West Sumatera, Riau, Jambi, Bengkulu, Riau Islands, Bangka Belitung, Lampung) to become ‘the sub-region of continuous development, progress, wealth, peace and quality of life’ according to the five-year IMT-GT Roadmap ( 2007–2011).

The Asian Development Bank subsequently undertook a detailed feasibility study & formulated the framework for co-operation. The study concluded that the IMT-GT had great potential to stimulate cross-border economic integration in 6 priority areas, namely: Infrastructure Development; Agriculture & Fisheries; Trade; Tourism; Human Resource Development; and Professional Services.

The IMT-GT JBC
The IMT-GT Joint Business Council (IMT-GT JBC)   was inaugurated in 1995 as the official vehicle to mobilise private sector participation & involvement in the IMT-GT. Between 1995–2005, the IMT-GT JBC facilitated the investment of an estimated US$3.80 billion worth of new projects in the IMT-GT region.

IMT-GT Goals
The overall goal of the IMT-GT is to accelerate private sector-led economic growth in the IMT-GT region by:
 a. Increasing trade & investment by exploiting the underlying economic complementariness and comparative advantages;
 b. Increasing exports to the rest of the world by enhancing competitiveness for exports and investment;
 c. Increasing the welfare of the people by creating employment, educational, social and cultural opportunities in the IMT-GT region;
 d. Encouraging the private sector to play a leading role, while the public sector facilitates and supports as much as possible

See also
 Indonesia–Malaysia–Singapore Growth Triangle
 Timor Leste–Indonesia–Australia Growth Triangle
 Brunei–Indonesia–Malaysia–Philippines East ASEAN Growth Area (BIMP-EAGA)

References

 IMT-GT Secretariat

Maritime Southeast Asia
Economy of Indonesia
Economy of Thailand
International organizations based in Asia
ASEAN
Malaysia–Thailand relations
Indonesia–Malaysia relations
Indonesia–Thailand relations
Foreign trade of Indonesia
Foreign trade of Malaysia